Santiago Giraldo and Cristian Rodríguez were the defending champion but Giraldo did not participate that year. Rodríguez played alongside Enrico Fioravante and they lost in the First Round.

Guillermo Durán and Máximo González won the title, defeating Riccardo Ghedin and Claudio Grassi in the final, 6–1, 3–6, [10–7].

Seeds

 Guillermo Durán /  Máximo González (champions)
 Riccardo Ghedin /  Claudio Grassi (final)
 Stephan Fransen /  Wesley Koolhof (quarterfinals)
 Roberto Maytín /  Andrés Molteni (semifinals)

Draw

Draw

References
 Main Draw

Distal and ITR Group Tennis Cup - Doubles
2014 - Doubles